Badagry Coconut Beach is located in Badagry town in the West of Lagos State, Nigeria. It is situated towards the border of the Benin Republic. The beach is surrounded by holiday resorts where people can rest, receive refreshments and entertainment while visiting the beach. According to reports, “Badagry currently harbors two million coconut trees and has the potential of having 10 million trees.”

References 

Beaches of Nigeria
Tourist attractions in Lagos State